Schmidt Nunataks is a cluster of nunataks 11 nautical miles (20 km) southeast of Governor Mountain in the Wilson Hills. Mapped by United States Geological Survey (USGS) from surveys and U.S. Navy air photos, 1960–63. Named by Advisory Committee on Antarctic Names (US-ACAN) for James L. Schmidt, AE2, U.S. Navy, Aviation Electrician's Mate of Squadron VX-6 and a member of the winter-over party at McMurdo Station, 1967.

Nunataks of Oates Land